This Just Might Be... the Truth is the first full-length album released by Swedish hardcore punk band Refused.

The album was first released in 1994 through Startrec Records (on tape, CD and 12" vinyl) was reissued by Burning Heart Records (Sweden) and Epitaph Records (US) in 1997. Recently, Startrec reissued a limited edition of the album, both on orange and black vinyl.

Track listing

Personnel 
 Dennis Lyxzén – lead vocals
 Pär Hansson – guitar
 Henrik Jansson – guitar
 Magnus Flagge – bass guitar
 David Sandström – drums, percussion
 Abhinanda, Shelter, Drift Apart – backing vocals
 Refused – production, backing vocals, layout
 Thomas Skogsberg – production, mixing
 Fred Estby – engineer

References 

Refused albums
1994 debut albums
Burning Heart Records albums